Marsiling MRT station is an above-ground Mass Rapid Transit (MRT) station on the North South line in Woodlands, Singapore.

Located along Woodlands Avenue 3 between the junctions of Woodlands Avenue 1, Woodlands Centre Road and Woodlands Street 11, Marsiling station serves the residential area in the western part of Woodlands New Town, and is the nearest MRT station to Woodlands Checkpoint located at Woodlands Crossing as well as Woodlands Train Checkpoint and the now-demolished old Woodlands Town Centre located at Woodlands Centre Road.

History

The government came up with a proposal to build the North South line Woodlands Extension in 1990 with the aim of extending the existing north–south and east–west lines, thus connecting Choa Chu Kang in the West to Yishun in the North. Marsiling was one of the four stations in the initial proposal which was later expanded to six. Construction commenced in 1991 and the station was opened on 10 February 1996 along with the other five stations on the Woodlands Extension. Formerly named Woodlands West, it was renamed to Marsiling in 1994.

Following numerous incidents of commuters falling on the tracks and unauthorized intrusions, the Land Transport Authority made the decision in 2008 to install half-height platform screen doors (HHPSD) for all above-ground stations in phases. HHPSDs started operation from 22 December 2011 with Admiralty. This station was installed with high-volume low-speed fans, which commenced operations on 21 November 2012.

Due to the station's proximity to neighbouring Housing and Development Board apartment blocks, a privacy screen was built along the tracks at the side of the station (southbound platform) facing these apartment blocks for privacy, similar to those installed at Pioneer MRT station. Cash top-ups are no longer accepted at Marsiling MRT station passenger service centre from 1 September 2017.

References

External links

 
 Marsiling to Changi Airport MRT station route

Railway stations in Singapore opened in 1996
Woodlands, Singapore
Mass Rapid Transit (Singapore) stations